Linda M. Brzustowicz (born November 13, 1960) is a professor of genetics at Rutgers University and a member of the Motif BioSciences Scientific Advisory Board, whose main purpose is to develop technology that will benefit all laboratories using "biosamples," or samples of blood, DNA, stem cells, etc. that advance the field of human genetics. She has produced notable research in human gene functions in both the pathologic and normal states, contributing to the understanding of genetics of schizophrenia, autism, and specific language impairment (SLI). Because the diagnosed cases of childhood autism have experienced an unprecedented spike in recent times, causing speculation about the debatable "autism epidemic," such research is invaluable.

Research

Brzustowicz and other geneticists at Rutgers are currently organizing a project to collect a new sample of families chosen for both autism and a history of language impairment in non-autistic family members in order to conduct a genome scan. In addition they are currently conducting genetic association studies of autism using samples from the AGRE and NIMH Human Genetics Initiative collections.

Brzustowicz and others, in collaboration with Dr. Anne Bassett at the University of Toronto, have conducted a genome-wide genetic linkage study of schizophrenia with a set of moderately large extended families from eastern Canada, and have identified "a major schizophrenia susceptibility locus on chromosome 1q21-22 with a multipoint lod score of 6.50 (p<0.0002)." Using the Positive and Negative Syndrome Scale (PANSS), they have also detected a significant linkage of the severity of positive symptoms of schizophrenia to chromosome 6.

Awards

2005 NARSAD Staglin Family Music Festival Schizophrenia Research Award
2000 NARSAD Independent Investigator Award
1996 New York State Psychiatric Institute, Centennial Award, Alumna of the Decade, 1990s
1994 New York State Psychiatric Institute Alumni Award for Research
1994 Mead Johnson Travel Fellow to the American College of Neuropsychopharmacology
1993 Ginsberg Fellow to the Group for the Advancement of Psychiatry
1990 NARSAD Young Investigator Award
1987 Alpha Omega Alpha Medical Honor Society
1987 Lange Medical Award for pre-clinical excellence in medical school
1987 Merck Award for overall academic excellence in medical school

Education
 Columbia University, New York, NY, Department of Psychiatry, Presbyterian Hospital and New York State Psychiatric Institute, Psychiatric Residency Training, July 1991 - June 1994
 Columbia University, New York, NY, Department of Psychiatry, New York State Psychiatric Institute Research Fellow and, Keck Scholar in Molecular Genetics, July 1988 - June 1991
 Brown University, Providence, RI, Department of Pediatrics, Rhode Island Hospital, Pediatric Internship, July 1987 - June 1988
 Columbia University, New York, NY, College of Physicians and Surgeons, M.D. May 1987, Alpha Omega Alpha Honor Society
 Harvard University, Cambridge, MA, Harvard-Radcliffe Colleges, A.B. Cum Laude in Biochemical Sciences, June 1982, Elizabeth Cary Agassiz Scholar, John Harvard Scholarship

See also
 NOS1AP

References

Living people
American geneticists
American women geneticists
Rutgers University faculty
1960 births
Columbia University Vagelos College of Physicians and Surgeons alumni
Radcliffe College alumni